Seekonk is a slowcore band formed in Portland, Maine in the winter of 2002. The band played its first shows as a quartet consisting of Patrick Corrigan (guitar, drums, vocals, vibraphone, keyboards), Dave Noyes (guitar, keyboards, vocals, cello, trombone) Shana Barry (lead vocals, theremin, keyboards) and Greg Murphy (drums).

Music
Shortly after the release of For Barbara Lee, Barry left the band and was replaced as lead singer by Sarah Ramey. This new line-up recorded Pinkwood in 2005, which was released the following year by Portland's North East Indie Records . Chris Burns joined the band in April 2006 for the ensuing US tour, playing bass, vibraphone and percussion. The last album recorded before they disbanded, Nice Wheelz, has never been released, though a vinyl release titled Pinkwood 2 was issued in 2010.

Members
Patrick Corrigan (guitar, vocals, drums, vibraphone, keyboards) 2002-2007
Dave Noyes (guitar, keyboards, vocals, cello, trombone) 2002-2007
Shana Barry (lead vocals, theremin, keyboards) 2002-2003
Jason Ingalls (drums, percussion, Vibraphone, Mandolin) 2002-2007
Todd Hutchisen (Guitar, vocals, steel guitar, Vibraphone, keyboards) 2002-2007
Sarah Ramey (vocals) 2003-2007
Chris Burns (bass, vibraphone and percussion) 2006-2007
Greg Murphy (drums) 2002

Discography

Albums
 For Barbara Lee (2003, Kimchee Records [KC 029 CD])
 Pinkwood (2006, North East Indie Records  (US) [NEI 43 CD/LP] / Tongue Master Records (UK) [TMAST 006 CD])
 Pinkwood 2 (2010, Burst & Bloom Records)

Compilations
 Greetings From Area Code 207, Vol. 4 (2003, Cornmeal Records [CMEAL 2074 CD]) track: "Maps of Egypt"
 Greetings From Area Code 207, Vol. 6 (2005, Cornmeal Records [CMEAL 2076 CD]) track: "Love"
 Greetings From Area Code 207, Vol. 7 (2008, Cornmeal Records [CMEAL 2077 CD]) track: "Waking"
 The Deafening Silence of a Very Bright Light [soundtrack] (2008, Bright Orange Turntable Productions) track: "The Great Compromise"

References

External links
 official site 
 North East Indie page for Pinkwood 
 Kimchee Records band page 
 Cornmeal Records audio samples of GFAC tracks

Indie rock musical groups from Maine
Musical groups from Portland, Maine
Rock music groups from Maine
Sadcore and slowcore groups